Moti Lal Bohara was the chief of Nepal Police from 1993-1997. He succeeded Ratna Shumsher J.B.R. as the police chief and was succeeded by Achyut Krishna Kharel.

It was during his tenure as chief that the "People's War" in Nepal began. He is the last known officer to have remained IGP for a full term (4 years).

As of 2014, Former police chief Moti Lal Bohara is involved as founding member of Maalika Development Bank in Dhangadi.

References

Living people
Year of birth missing (living people)
Nepalese police officers
Chiefs of police
Inspectors General of Police (Nepal)
People from Achham District
People of the Nepalese Civil War